Ould el-Hamra Mosque is a mosque in the medina of Casablanca first erected in 1789. Along with the Ettedgui Synagogue and the Church of San Buenaventura, it is of the three buildings representing the three Abrahamic religions in a space of 250 m2 in the medina.

History 
It was erected under Sultan Muhammad III bin Abdellah in the year 1204 of the Hijra, or 1789. Casablanca was one of a number of cities—including Essaouira, Marrakesh, and Rabat—that Sultan Muhammad III revitalized after the earthquake of 1755. The historian Abdallah Laroui called the sultan "the architect of modern Morocco."

It underwent renovations under Sultan Hassan I in the year 1320 of the Hijra, or 1892.

It underwent restoration work supervised by the  staring May 14, 2010. King Mohammed VI inaugurated the mosque after the restoration with a Friday sermon December 16, 2016.

Architecture 
The architecture of the mosque is Maghrebi. The prayer hall can fit 1500 people.

References 

Mosques in Morocco
Religious buildings and structures in Casablanca